The  is a Japanese commuter rail line between Kachigawa Station in Kasugai and Biwajima Station in Kiyosu in Aichi Prefecture. Trains are operated by Tokai Transport Service Company, or TKJ in short, while its rail facilities belong to Central Japan Railway Company (JR Central). TKJ, a wholly owned subsidiary of JR Central, operates this line.

Services
All trains stop at all stations, and there are no limited stop rapid services. Services operate once per an hour in daytime, and 2 or 3 times per an hour in the morning and evening.

Stations
All stations are in Aichi Prefecture.

Rolling stock
The line is operated using a fleet of four KiHa 11 single-car diesel multiple unit DMUs.

When the line first opened, services were operated using KiHa 40 series single-car DMUs leased from JR Central. These were painted in the TJK livery of cream with orange window band.

Up until April 2015, the fleet consisted of four KiHa 11-200 series cars (KiHa 11-201–204), based at Kachigawa Depot. Two of these (KiHa 11-203 and 204) were sold to the Hitachinaka Kaihin Railway in Ibaraki Prefecture in April 2015. KiHa 11-201 was withdrawn from Johoku Line services on 23 September 2015, and sold to the Hitachinaka Kaihin Railway. It was replaced from 24 September 2015 by KiHa 11-300 series car KiHa 11-301, purchased from JR Central. The remaining KiHa 11-200 series car (KiHa 11-202) was scheduled to be replaced by a KiHa 11-300 series car in 2016.

History
Construction began in March 1976, but was subsequently halted due to the huge deficit of JNR. The line consisted of two separate sections, one between Setoshi and Kōzōji, and another between Kachigawa and Biwajima. Construction of the both sections resumed later, as passenger lines, but by different operators. The former section, the current Johoku Line, was succeeded by Tokai Transport Service, while the latter, the current Jōhoku Line, was succeeded by JR Central and TKJ. The first section of the Jōhoku Line, between Kachigawa and Owari-Hoshinomiya, opened on 1 December 1991. The section between Owari-Hoshinomiya and Biwajima opened on 18 March 1993.

Passenger statistics
In fiscal 2009, the line was used by an average of 1,384 passengers daily.

See also
List of railway lines in Japan

References

External links

 TKJ official website 

Lines of Central Japan Railway Company
Rail transport in Aichi Prefecture
Railway lines opened in 1991
1067 mm gauge railways in Japan
1991 establishments in Japan